The 2019 Mosconi Cup (also known as Mosconi Cup XXVI) was a team nine-ball tournament. The event is the 26th Mosconi Cup event, first held in 1994. The competition features matches between teams of five representing Europe and the United States. The event was held at Mandalay Bay, Las Vegas, United States between 25–28 November 2019. The event is based on the similar Ryder Cup series of events held in golf.

The USA team were defending champions, having won the 2018 event 11–9. Despite trailing 2-3 after the first day, the USA team took a 8–7 lead on day three, and eventually won 11–8. Skyler Woodward won the Most Valuable Player award for the second time, having also done so the year prior.

Teams

Results

Monday, 25 November

Tuesday, 26 November

Wednesday, 27 November

Thursday, 28 November

References

External links
 Official homepage

2019
2019 in cue sports
2019 in American sports
2019 in sports in Nevada
2019
November 2019 sports events in the United States
Mosconi Cup 2019